Boca Pointe was a census-designated place (CDP) located in an unincorporated area near Boca Raton in Palm Beach County, Florida, United States. The population was 3,302 at the 2000 census. The CDP was not included in the 2010 census. While it is not officially in the City of Boca Raton, the community is frequently classified under its umbrella term.

Geography

According to the United States Census Bureau, the CDP had a total area of 3.0 km2 (1.1 mi2), all land.

Demographics

As of the census of 2000, there were 3,302 people, 1,824 households, and 1,136 families residing in the CDP. The population density was 1,108.6/km2 (2,867.7/mi2). There were 2,089 housing units at an average density of 701.4/km2 (1,814.2/mi2). The racial makeup of the CDP was 98.64% White (95.6% were Non-Hispanic White,) 0.39% African American, 0.61% Asian, 0.18% from other races, and 0.18% from two or more races. Hispanic or Latino of any race were 3.36% of the population.

There were 1,824 households, out of which 5.1% had children under the age of 18 living with them, 58.8% were married couples living together, 2.9% had a female householder with no husband present, and 37.7% were non-families. 32.6% of all households were made up of individuals, and 19.2% had someone living alone who was 65 years of age or older. The average household size was 1.81 and the average family size was 2.21.

In the CDP, the population was spread out, with 4.6% under the age of 18, 1.5% from 18 to 24, 9.3% from 25 to 44, 31.7% from 45 to 64, and 52.9% who were 65 years of age or older. The median age was 66 years. For every 100 females, there were 79.3 males. For every 100 females age 18 and over, there were 78.7 males.

The median income for a household in the CDP was $90,476, and the median income for a family was $104,601. Males had a median income of $81,611 versus $37,143 for females. The per capita income for the CDP was $66,797. None of the families and 2.0% of the population were living below the poverty line, including no under eighteens and 2.2% of those over 64.

As of 2000, English as a first language accounted for 94.11% of all residents, while Spanish made up 4.87%, and French was the mother tongue for 1.00% of the population.

References

The Club at Boca Pointe

The Club at Boca Pointe, formerly known as Boca Pointe Country Club, is a non-mandatory country club located within the gated Boca Pointe community in Boca Raton, Florida. The Club at Boca Pointe features an 18-hole Jack Nicklaus-designed championship golf course, 29 Har-Tru tennis courts, three restaurants, two lounges, men's and ladies' card rooms, a fully equipped  athletics center, a day spa and two Olympic-size pools. The Club also features a full calendar of social activities including lifelong learning programs taught by professors from local universities, offsite trips, onsite entertainment, book discussion groups and hobby clubs. It is a Club dedicated to relaxation, friendly games and competition.

The Club has 1,288 equity members. While most members hold equity memberships in the Club, non-equity memberships are also offered to cater to members' individual lifestyles if they do not live in South Florida full-time. In 2009, Boca Pointe Country Club changed its name to The Club at Boca Pointe to reflect a change in potential members who did not want to belong to a traditional country club. To evolve into a club for the Baby Boomer generation, new programs and memberships were developed to specifically attract retiring Baby Boomers who crave an active lifestyle with an emphasis on wellness, socialization and lifelong learning.  
           
The Club at Boca Pointe is a separate entity from the Boca Pointe Community Association, with its own Board of Governors, management and employees. Although separate organizations, the management and staff of both work closely together.

External links
 Boca Pointe Community Association
 The Club at Boca Pointe

Former census-designated places in Palm Beach County, Florida
Former census-designated places in Florida